Charles Arthur Ford Whitcombe (1872-1930) A.R.I.B.A. was a British architect, best known for his ecclesiastical designs. He was from Tibberton, Worcestershire and had his London office at 5 Newman Street, Oxford Street. In 1916 he emigrated to Queensland, Australia to become 'Chief Instructor - Architecture' at the Central Technical College, Brisbane.

List of work

United Kingdom
 1896 Chapel of St Mary's Convent, Chiswick, London.
 Picturesque chapel with a small tower, in a free arts and Crafts Gothic. Classical reredos. Ceiling paintings by George Ostrehan; tapestry panel by Morris & Co.
 1900 Church of St James Huddington, Worcestershire
 1900–01 Church of St Michael  Huddington, Worcestershire 
 1902–05 Church of Holy Trinity Ettington, Warwickshire 
 1902–06 Church of All Saints Huthwaite, Hucknall, Nottinghamshire.
 The new church built on the Common and Sutton Roads, Hucknall, Huthwaite [sic], has been erected from designs by Mr C. Ford Whitcombe, of London. The style is that of the fourteenth century period of English Gothic, and the building will seat 500 people.
 1903 Church of Christ Church Broadheath, Worcestershire
 1903 Church of St John the Baptist and St Felix Felixstowe, Suffolk
 Pulpit 1903 by Whitcombe and Cogswell. 
 1903–05 Church of St Andrew Hampton, Worcestershire
 1903–05 Church of St John the Baptist Feckenham, Worcestershire
 1904–05 Church of St Mary Herbrandston, Pembrokeshire
 1905–07 Church of All Saints Chadshunt, Warwickshire
 1905–08 Church of St John the Baptist Farnham Common, Buckinghamshire
 1905–08 Church of St Mary Magdalen Himbleton, Worcestershire 
 1905–08 Church of St Barnabas Southfields, London
 1906 Church of St Andrew Cleeve Prior, Worcestershire
 1906 Church of St Michael Huddington, Worcestershire
 1909 Church of St John Helen's Bay, Belfast, in partnership with William Gerald St John Cogswell.
 1909 The Church of St Peter Rugby, Warwickshire.;
 1909 The Church of St Matthew Buckley, Flintshire. 
 A three-light window depicting St Anne teaching her daughter Mary, St Hilda teaching in her monastery at Whitby, and St Monica teaching her son Augustine.

References

1872 births
1930 deaths
19th-century English architects
20th-century English architects
Architects from Worcestershire
British emigrants to Australia